Fenton is one of the six towns that amalgamated with  Hanley, Tunstall, Burslem, Longton and Stoke-upon-Trent to form the county borough of Stoke-on-Trent in 1910, later raised to city status in 1925. Fenton is often referred to as "the Forgotten Town", because it was omitted by local author, Arnold Bennett, from many of his works based in the area, including one of his most famous novels, Anna of the Five Towns. It is in the ceremonial county of Staffordshire, England

History

Etymology
The name Fenton means 'fen farm'.

Administration
Fenton started to become populated as a group of farms and private small-holdings were built there, alongside a lane running from the southern reaches of Hanley (by 1933 this lane was very busy and given the title of the A50).

Around the 1750s, the land was commonly known as Fenton Vivian, after Vivian of Standon and his heirs, its lords in the thirteenth century. By the 1850s, the area around Duke Street and China Street had become populated during the rapid development of the Potteries.

Potters settled in Fenton in large houses alongside their potbanks. Such houses include Great Fenton Hall, Fenton House (home of the Baker family), Heron Cottage and Grove House.

The two principal districts, Fenton Vivian and Fenton Culvert – each with their scattered communities, were brought together to make an urban district with its own board of guardians in 1894.

On 1 April 1910, the town was federated into the county borough of Stoke-on-Trent. By 1925, the area was granted city status.

Industry
Fenton has been the home to a number of potteries such as Coalport and Baker & Co, and its architectural heritage includes listed bottle ovens.

First World War
During the First World War Fenton was bombed by Zeppelin 'L 21'.

Geography
It is within easy reach of the A500, A34 and the A50, a short distance away from Longton, Hanley, Newcastle, and Stoke itself.

Suburbs
Although Fenton has large industrial plants, particularly from the pottery trade, it has always been considered more of a residential area.

Fenton includes Heron Cross, Mount Pleasant, Saxonfields, Pool Dole, Lane Delph and Fenpark.

Places of interest

Fenton Town Hall, which latterly served as the local magistrates' court, was commissioned by local pottery owner, William Meath Baker, at his own expense, to a design by Robert Scrivener and completed in 1888.

William Meath Baker was a very good friend of the great English composer, Sir Edward Elgar, who included him in his world-famous Enigma Variations (Variation IV).

Fenton Manor has a swimming pool, gym, and fitness centre, plus a 1,300-seater arena. Fenton Park has football pitches, pavilions, and a playground.

Economy
Fenton differs from the other Potteries towns in that it does not have a town centre. Instead, amenities and shops are spread over a sizeable area.

Notable people

 Richard Bolton (1570?–1648) English lawyer, an important figure in the politics of Ireland
 Sir Edward Bolton (1592–1659) English judge who served as Solicitor General for Ireland 
 Jeremiah Yates (1810–1852) active Chartist, imprisoned for one year for bringing workers out on strike during the 1842 Pottery Riots
 James Wright (1819–1887) a notable New Zealand potter, born in Fenton 
 Mortimer Brown (1874–1966) English sculptor, his early work was based on religious and classical themes. 
 David Gordon Hines (1915–2000) chartered accountant and colonial administrator, developed farming co-operatives in Tanganyika
 Ken Leese (born 1928) member of the Queensland Legislative Assembly.
 Frank Bough (1933–2020) English television presenter.
 Michael Bettaney (born 1950) MI5 officer, convicted of passing sensitive documents to the Soviet Embassy in London.
 Paul Bown (born 1957) is an English TV actor.

Sport 
 Len Birks (1896–1975) footballer, over 250 club caps, including 101 for Port Vale F.C.
 Billy Briscoe (1896–1994) footballer, 473 club caps, including over 300 for Port Vale F.C.
 Jack Griffiths (1909–1975) footballer, 194 club caps for Wolves, Bolton Wanderers F.C. and Manchester United F.C. 
 Ronnie Allen (1929–2001) footballer, 638 club caps, mainly for Port Vale F.C. and WBA
 Stan Steele (born 1937) former footballer, scored 97 goals in 370 league and cup games for Port Vale F.C.
 Catherine Swinnerton (born 1958) former racing cyclist, competed at the 1984 Summer Olympics in Los Angeles.
 Ryan Shotton (born 1988) footballer, over 200 club caps, plays for Birmingham City F.C.
 John Harvey (cyclist) (born 1884) Champion cyclist

In popular culture
In the Jorge Luis Borges short story The Garden of Forking Paths, Dr. Yu Tsun goes to a suburb of Fenton to meet Stephen Albert.

References

Town profile at The Sentinel

External links

Use interactive maps to find historic artefacts and photographs of old Fenton at exploringthepotteries.org.uk
Town profile at The Sentinel (local newspaper)

Areas of Stoke-on-Trent
Towns in Staffordshire
Former civil parishes in Staffordshire